There have been two baronetcies created for members of the Stern family, both in the Baronetage of the United Kingdom. Both creations are extinct.

The Stern Baronetcy, of Strawberry Hill in the parish of Twickenham and County of Middlesex, was created in the Baronetage of the United Kingdom on 31 July 1905. For more information on this creation, see Baron Michelham.

The Stern Baronetcy, of Chertsey in the County of Surrey, was created in the Baronetage of the United Kingdom on 16 June 1922 for the benefactor Edward Stern. He was the son of Viscount de Stern, the younger brother of Sydney Stern, 1st Baron Wandsworth and the first cousin of the first Baronet of the 1905 creation. The title became extinct on Stern's death in 1933.

Family seats
Despite its Edwardian three-storey ornate façade, Fan Court, on the Longcross/Lyne border in north-west Surrey is not a listed building but was the principal home of Edward Stern 'of Chertsey' which was then its parish from at least 1911.    A farmer as well as businessman, Sir Edward regularly entered many entries into the Chertsey Agricultural Show, until at least 1928.

Stern baronets, of Strawberry Hill (1905)
see Baron Michelham

Stern baronets, of Chertsey (1922)
Sir Edward David Stern, 1st Baronet (1854–1933)

References

Extinct baronetcies in the Baronetage of the United Kingdom
Stern family (banking)